San José Chinantequilla is a Mexican community by the state of Oaxaca, in the municipality of Totontepec Villa de Morelos located in the mixe district, is located in the sierra norte. It was founded by migrants from Guanajuato in 1913.

In 1920, it joined the municipality of Totontepec Villa de Morelos first called "Chinantequilla" name in 1969 was replaced by the "San Jose Chinantequilla", derived from the chinanteco which means A bank of Grass. In mixe is written M³eviam and the meaning of the name is the same, the municipality is located about 162 km from the state capital.

Toponymy 
The name comes from the name chinantec Chinan meaning "shore", Qiya meaning in Spanish grass, common plant in this region, the suffix "te" is equivalent to tepec which means "place" in an abbreviated form. Phonetically, it would read the glyph as Chinan-te-quiya, i.e. "on the edge of grass." In Cojum, an adaptation of mixe language is written Käjpen Mëeviam means At the edge of the hill of grass.

History 
 
The origin of this population  is unknown as well as other mixe communities as it had recorded little data about the history of this community, researchers assume that was one of the last people to get to the mixe region, so it is considered a "young poblation".

There is a theory of the origin of this town which recounts the arrival of migrants from the Guanajuato who settled in this place, then this area belonged to the community of Santiago Amatepec having as neighbors and former foes, the Chinanteco who lived in the territory of San Juan Comaltepec with whom he had several years of fighting for dominance of this same territory that ends with the arrival of Ignacio Franco, a law graduate, who held a talk with the then ruler of Amatepec this he proposed to grant the territory of present Chinantequilla (which was in dispute) if they helped him back, made after a lawsuit that lasted about a year solving rule favorably on the request of Santiago Amatepec finally May 13, 1913 was granted a certificate to Ignacio Franco in which ceded the territory of what is now Chinantequilla known as San José Chinantequilla. Currently Mixes are considered as a warlike people, who held both the Zapotec struggles, as the Mixtec, gave the Spanish fight for what they are called "the unconquered."

On June 25, 1920. The XXXIV Legislature of the State of Oaxaca issued Decree No. 194 which "grants category Municipal Agency, part of the municipality of Totontepec Villa de Morelos, the village called Chinantequilla."

Geography 
 
San Jose Chinantequilla is located northeast of Oaxaca and on top of the Sierra Mixe, part of the Sierra Norte Region and Mixe District, belongs the municipality of Totontepec Villa de Morelos has an area of approximately 6.9 square kilometers, which represents 0.9% of the total territory of the Mixe District. It lies between latitudes 17 ° 15 '- 17 ° 12' north latitude and 96 ° 02 '- 96 ° 09' west longitude, the altitude of its territory lies 1 000 to 1300 meters above sea level. 
Chinantequilla is located in the Sierra Madre de Oaxaca and is part of the extension of the Sierra Madre Oriental so it is located on a hillside. Currently have facilitated means of communication in this area, which was previously very difficult to access.

Topography and hydrography 
Nestled in one of the highest in the Sierra Mixe, the territory of San Jose is extremely rugged Chinantequilla, crossed by large mountains that make it difficult terrestrial communications, the main elevation of this area is the called Cerro Cotton at a height of about 1.396 meters above sea level, important for its historical and cultural value. There are several springs of water in the rainy season that are not used, the rivers of this area arrive at the basin the Rio Papaloapan and the sub-basin K 2832.

Climate 
San Jose Chinantequilla is lying on a fertile soil with varied climates ranging from semi-warm and temperate sub-humid with summer rains, with rainfall 2,500 to 3,000 millimeters. In this community, located in the Northern Highlands, the average temperature ranges from 17 °C to 32 °C.

Natural Resources

Flora 
The vegetation presents Chinantequilla territory is varied due to the range of altitudes above sea level available, it allows for a wide variety of vegetation, for example in the highest part of the vegetation is cloud forest characteristic of mountain s covered mist, there is also the presence of secondary forest tree, in the presence of pines and oaks, at the bottom there bat eagle, strawberry, sweetgum, among others.

As for vegetation grown there is the presence of flower is like lily, gladiola, hydrangea, tulip, bougainvillea, geranium, alcatraz and aretillo. Not to mention the vegetables and fruit trees that are part of the vegetation community as maize, smells at night, popuchu, quintoniles, squash, mustard, chard, orange, banana, sweet lemon, black sapote, sapodilla, avocado, loquat, tangerine, peach and coffee for this crop is usually managed under shade (trees that used for shade are: banana, orange and cedar).

Fauna 
The fauna of this area is varied. Due to conservation in some communities, its forests are rich in wildlife with a great diversity of wildlife. In some areas, these animals are threatened by the destruction of natural ecosystems, although hunting of animals remains free because there are animals that damage crops. Listed below are the wild animals that can be found in Chinantequilla:

Squirrel, brocket, badger, pig bird turkey, tepescuintle, armadillo, fox, raccoon, tiger, opossum, gopher, ocelot, hawk, heron, snakes coral snake and sleepy parrot and panther.

Demography 
According to the results of Census of Population and Housing 2010 by the National Institute of Statistics and Geography, the population of San Jose Chinantequilla is 507 inhabitants, of which 254 are men and 253 are women; so that 51% of the population are males, the rate population growth 2005 in 2010 was 4.2%, 46.6% of residents are under 15 years of age, while between that age and 84 years is 53.4% of the residents, and 91.7% of residents over age five are speakers of an Indian language. In 2010 this figure equates to a total of 416 inhabitants, of whom 204 are men and 197 women, 400 are bilingual to the Spanish, 5 are monolingual and 11 do not specify the condition of bilingualism.

Of the 416 indigenous language speakers, 411 are of mixe, 4 zapotec and 1 mixtec In addition, 12 did not specify which their mother tongue.

Administrative organization 
San Jose Chinantequilla is an agency within the municipality of Totontepec Villa de Morelos, this is one of the 424 Oaxacan municipalities to govern their government the system called customs and traditions, whereby the choice and operation of the municipal authorities do not stick to the political systems in the rest of state and the country but to the ancient traditions of inhabitants of the region, adhering to their culture, the city agency is made up of municipal police officer, an alderman who is in charge of organizing the traditional festivals and Secretary, which controls documentation, all these activities are regulated Totontepec Villa de Morelos.

Economic activities 
Economic activities that are practiced in this community include: production and marketing of the primary sector.
Most of the inhabitants of this municipality is engaged in agriculture involving the cultivation of corn, beans, bananas, fruit and vegetable production as well as brandy.

Social infrastructure

Education 
The municipality has the following schools:

A kindergarten level has a staff.

At the primary level has a federal type institution.

At the secondary level has a Telesecundaria.

Abast 
It has no public or flea markets so that people are supplied by the surrounding street market, commodities are purchased in small miscellaneous blocks.

Sports 
The main sport practised in the area is basketball, and it has 2 courts at the agency.

Housing 
According to the results presented in the Second Census of Population and Housing in 2010, the municipality has a total of 440 houses of which 382 are inhabited.

Local cuisine 
The cuisine of San Jose Chinantequilla is extremely rich and varied, combining the main ingredients of Indian and Mexican cuisine. All these dishes have been passed from generation to generation and are an indelible part of the mixe culture in general. among Oaxacan dishes include:

Machuco Pumpkin Seed

It is made with a tortilla dough a little thicker than the common, once cooked is placed on a plate is crushed until it crumbles and add a sauce made from roasted pumpkin seeds, tomato, onion and green chile is accompanied with a little cheese.

Quebrajado de Plátano

It is a dish prepared with beans and plantains, beans once cooked pieces are added green plantain chips off and chopped green chile, stir to form a homogeneous mixture thickens and is served in a bowl, the company with corn or banana and quelites.

Dried beef broth with chicken

Prepare a broth with dried beef that is very common in this area and chicken, the process is like any traditional broth you can add various vegetables, once cooked ingredients are usually accompanied with Puñete that only a tamale made with corn and a little salt can also be simple.

Champurrado.

This drink is known for using the dough with preparing the tortillas. Breaks down in a little water and then strain. Boil and chocolate with sugar added. The recipe is originally from Oaxaca and enjoyed in the festivities of this population.
Other dishes, snacks and drinks prepared in this community among which are: tamales of mole, beans, chicken and topotillo which is a kind of fish, memela, it is also customary tepache cane, panela gruel, coffee and liquor.

Culture and traditions

Feast day of the dead 
The celebration of the Day of the Dead in San Jose Chinantequilla is popular in a ceremony that is believed to invoke the spirits of the ancestors, asking them to "live" in the underworld, so it seeks to entertain the more attentive to an offering. The first of November is "to bring the dead", the custom is to give to relatives and family friends a gifted sample the food that make the offering of the dead. Delivery is door to door. This day has been honored the "angels", i.e. the relatives who died as children. On November 2 they worship the deceased adults.

All Saints and All Souls are occasions for the villagers perform their ancestral customs. Some pray for their families past, some going to the cemeteries to decorate graves in cemeteries that remain, preparing the altar and killed.

Celebrations employer 
The festivals celebrated in Chinantequilla days are December 12 in honor of the Virgin of Guadalupe, December 24 in honor of Jesus of Nazareth and May 11 in honor of San José, in these celebrations are interpreted as different dances: Dance of Negritos, Dance of the Moors and Christians and Dance of the Conquest as well as traditional songs. 
The music includes arias, funeral marches, danzones boleros, Chilean, peteneras, waltzes, and cumbias.

References 
 Address general population of Oaxaca (CONAPO), Department of Population Research.
 DIGEPO-CONAPO, Oaxaca 2000 and 2010.
 General Census of Population and Housing 2005, National Institute of Statistics, Geography and Informatics.
 1:50,000 scale topographic maps; E14D49, E15C41, E14D59 And E15C51, National Institute of Statistics, Geography and Informatics.
 Agroecology and Sustainable Development, 2nd. International Seminar on Agro ecology. Chapingo, Mexico 1995.
 The Municipal and Rural Development - First meeting of mayors, Mexico City, November 2001.

Notes

External links 
San Jose Chinantequilla in other Wikimedia projects.

San Jose Chinantequilla on Internet.

Populated places in Oaxaca